Kline Iron and Steel was a company based in Columbia, South Carolina.  Established on February 23, 1923, as Kline Iron and Metal Co., since 1953 was primarily known for the construction of broadcast towers. This includes the world's tallest completed man-made structure, the KVLY-TV mast, surpassed only by the recently completed Burj Khalifa.

History Timeline:
 1923- Kline Iron and Metal, Co. founded. 
 1984- Central Tower founded.
 2001- Central Tower is acquired by Dielectric Communications.
 2004- Dielectric Communications acquires Kline Iron and Metal Co.
 2005- Central Tower and Kline Tower merge to form Dielectric Tower Operations.
 2006- Dielectric Tower Operations sold to Liberty Industries to form Tower Innovations.

References

Companies based in Columbia, South Carolina
Manufacturing companies established in 1923
1923 establishments in South Carolina
Defunct manufacturing companies based in South Carolina

4.  http://digital.library.sc.edu/exhibits/kline/ Oral history collection, University of South Carolina, 2018.